Robert Holmes may refer to:

Law
 Robert Holmes (barrister) (1765–1859), Irish lawyer and nationalist
 Robert E. Holmes (1922–2004), Ohio state supreme court justice

Politics
 Robert Holmes (Gloucestershire MP), elected in 1653
 Robert Holmes (Canadian politician) (1852–1932), Canadian Member of Parliament
 Robert D. Holmes (1909–1976), governor of Oregon
 Bob Holmes (politician), Georgia state legislator

Sports
 Bob Holmes (footballer) (1867–1955), England & Preston North End footballer
 Bobby Holmes (born 1932), Scottish footballer
 Robert Holmes (American football) (1945–2018), running back for the Kansas City Chiefs and Houston Oilers

Other
 Robert Holmes (Royal Navy officer) (1622–1692), English admiral
 Robert Holmes (priest) (1748–1805), English Biblical scholar and Dean of Winchester
 Robert Holmes (engineer) (1856–1936), New Zealand civil engineer
 Robert H. Holmes (1888–1917), first NYPD African-American officer to die in the line of duty
 Robert Holmes (scriptwriter) (1926–1986), English TV scriptwriter
 Robert L. Holmes (born 1935), professor of philosophy at the University of Rochester
 Robert Holmes (musician), guitarist for the band 'Til Tuesday
 Bob Holmes (artist) (born 1963), British artist

See also 
Robert Holmes à Court (1937–1990), businessman
Robert Holme (disambiguation)